LaRosa's Pizzeria is a chain of pizzerias serving neighborhoods throughout Ohio, Kentucky, and Indiana. It was founded in 1954 by Donald "Buddy" LaRosa, along with partners Richard "Muzzie" Minella, Mike Soldano and Frank "Head" Serraino. Originally called Papa Gino's, LaRosa later bought out his partners, and changed the name to LaRosa's.

In addition to serving guests in its pizzerias, LaRosa's is also the exclusive pizza served at the Kings Island and Coney Island amusement parks, the Cincinnati Zoo and Botanical Garden, Perfect North Slopes, Great American Ball Park (home of the Cincinnati Reds), TQL Stadium (home of MLS's FC Cincinnati), and Cincinnati Children's Hospital Medical Center.

History
Buddy LaRosa agreed to help his mother and aunts sell pizza at their church festival in the summer of 1953. Buddy is of Sicilian heritage, and pizza was familiar in his home. But it was still new to most of his German-American neighbors in Cincinnati. Their pizza was a hit and the wheels in Buddy's head began to turn. In 1954, Buddy cashed in a life insurance policy to rent his first restaurant building and pizza oven.

Beginning with just one location on Boudinot Avenue in the Westwood area of Cincinnati, the family and franchise owners now operate 65 pizzerias, with total annual sales of $185 million.

LaRosa's is very popular in Greater Cincinnati. It has a 25 percent share of the local pizza market and boasts one of the highest sales volumes per pizzeria in the nation. Among U.S. pizza chains, LaRosa's has average per store sales that far outpace Domino's, Donatos Pizza, Little Caesars, Papa John's, and Pizza Hut .

Expansion 
LaRosa's first franchise was sold in 1967 in Finneytown, Ohio. Following that, additional franchises were opened in Greater Cincinnati communities such as Clifton, Hyde Park, and White Oak. By 1980, LaRosa's had 25 locations.

Between 2004 and 2014, LaRosa's carefully expanded further with corporately owned and franchise locations in Middletown, Liberty Township, Loveland, Mason, Colerain Township, and Oxford, among others, as well as locations in Northern Kentucky and Southeastern Indiana.
In 1991, LaRosa's invested heavily in the implementation and marketing of a single-number call center for delivery and carry out orders. Its phone number, 347-1111 is prominently featured in advertising. The creation of a One Number was a major innovation in pizza ordering. To keep LaRosa's One Number top of mind, a recognizable jingle was used to promote the number. LaRosa's One Number call center can take hundreds of calls at one time. In 2003, LaRosa's added an online ordering system to target the teenage demographic specifically. In 2015, LaRosa's introduced a mobile app for ordering carry out and delivery items. 
In 1991, LaRosa's invested heavily in the implementation and marketing of a single-number call center for delivery and carry out orders. Its phone number, 347-1111 is prominently featured in advertising. The creation of a One Number was a major innovation in pizza ordering. To keep LaRosa's One Number top of mind, a recognizable jingle was used to promote the number. LaRosa's One Number call center can take hundreds of calls at one time. In 2003, LaRosa's added an online ordering system to target the teenage demographic specifically. In 2015, LaRosa's introduced a mobile app for ordering carry out and delivery items.

Menu
LaRosa's signature pizza is a thin crust variety made with a distinctive thick, sweet sauce (a family recipe created by Buddy's Aunt Dena) and topped with provolone cheese. Their menu also includes "hoagys" with a variety of fillings and condiments, as well as calzones, salads, and pastas.

The restaurant offers over 40 menu items and prides itself in using high-quality ingredients in its family recipes.

In 2012, LaRosa's launched a gluten-free pizza to accommodate guests with specific dietary needs. While the restaurant initially limited the menu item to 8 restaurants to ensure that their staff members mastered the proper preparation and cleaning techniques involved, gluten-free options are now available at 15 pizzerias in Ohio and Kentucky, as well as Kings Island and Cincinnati Children's.

In February 2022, LaRosa's introduced plant-based protein menu options to better serve their guests' growing interest in healthier eating and meat alternatives. Their Plant-Based Deluxe Pizza is made with plant-based pepperoni, plant-based Italian sausage, green peppers, onions, and vegan cheese. After testing the meat alternatives in select pizzerias, the company rolled out plant-based options to all 65 LaRosa's locations in Greater Cincinnati, Central Kentucky, and Southeast Indiana in September 2022.

LaRosa's also offers its pasta and pizza sauces, salad dressings, Sweet & Spicy Diablo Sauce for dipping, and other selections from its menu at many Cincinnati grocery stores.

Leadership 
In 2008, leadership of the company shifted as the founder, Buddy LaRosa, moved into the role of Chairman Emeritus. During the same year, longtime Chief Executive Officer T.D. Hughes was succeeded by Buddy's son, Michael LaRosa. Mark LaRosa, also Buddy's son, serves as President and Chief Culinary Officer.

In 1999, Michael's son Nick LaRosa joined the company and today is Executive Vice President of Strategy and Business Intelligence, becoming the third generation of the LaRosa family to serve in leadership of the family-managed pizza chain.

Community Involvement 
LaRosa's has always been active in the neighborhoods it serves, sponsoring local youth sports programs.

LaRosa's supports community athletic programs and honors students through the Buddy LaRosa High School Sports Hall of Fame. Since founding the Hall of Fame in 1975, LaRosa's has honored nearly 300 exceptional athletes.

Buddy LaRosa is also the founder of Cincinnati Golden Gloves for Youth. Through Buddy's generosity, the organization moved to a new location at the Over-the-Rhine Recreation Center in 2013, following the construction of a new boxing gym.

During the Cincinnati Reds' season, LaRosa's offers a "Strikeouts for Slices" promotion. When Reds pitchers strike out at least 11 opposing batters, fans at Great American Ball Park win a free small one-topping pizza. To date, those giveaway pizzas have had a total retail value of several million dollars. During 2020, when fans were not at the stadium, due to COVID-19 restrictions, LaRosa's contributed $1,000 to the Reds Community Fund (which supports the region's baseball and softball programs), every time Reds pitchers struck out at least 11 opposing batters.

In 2011, LaRosa's became the first company to receive the Family Business Hall of Fame Award from the University of Cincinnati's Goering Center. The honor recognized the business for their long-term impact through commitment to philanthropy, community service, growth of employment, and community image. In addition, founder Buddy LaRosa was named a Greatest Living Cincinnatian in 2015 and was awarded Father of the Year by Talbert House in 2016. In December 2022, Buddy was inducted into the Ohio Restaurant Association's Hall of Fame.

In 2020, in celebration of Buddy's 90th birthday, the LaRosa Family Foundation was formed to ensure his legacy of community involvement. The Foundation supports programs and activities dedicated to the development of youth and adolescents through education, athletics, and life-skill development.

See also
 List of pizza chains of the United States

References

External links 

Data file including all locations for your GPS

Pizza chains of the United States
Regional restaurant chains in the United States
Restaurants established in 1954
Companies based in Cincinnati
Cuisine of Cincinnati
Restaurants in Cincinnati